The Northstar Line  is a commuter rail route in the US state of Minnesota. Northstar runs  from Big Lake to downtown Minneapolis at Target Field using existing track and right-of-way owned by the BNSF Railway. Passenger service began on November 16, 2009. The rail line serves part of the Northstar Corridor between Minneapolis and St. Cloud. Planning for the line began in 1997 when the Northstar Corridor Development Authority (NCDA) was formed. The corridor is also served by Interstate 94 and U.S. Highway 10.

Background 
The route was initially designed to run the full distance between Minneapolis and Rice, Minnesota, northwest of St. Cloud.  The project was counting on federal funding for half of its construction costs.  The estimated ridership for the full route was not high enough to qualify for that much needed federal funding.

When the line was first proposed, then-Governor Jesse Ventura was an early advocate and convinced some people to come around to his point of view. Ventura's successor, Governor Tim Pawlenty, did not initially support it.  He changed his mind after MnDOT determined that a scaled-back version of the line would qualify for federal funding.

The 2004 Minnesota Legislative session did not pass a bonding bill, which meant a lack of funds for initial project work.  Some counties in the area and the Metropolitan Council came up with matching funds to allow funding from the United States federal government to continue.

During the 2005 state legislative session, a bonding bill including $37.5 million of funding for the proposed project was passed.  The bill was signed on April 11, 2005, by Governor Tim Pawlenty at the site of the Riverdale station in Coon Rapids.   The 2006 state legislature, along with city, county and federal governments, provided funding to complete the corridor to Big Lake.

Construction began on the maintenance facility near Big Lake station and on the Blue Line light rail extension in September 2007, before full funding for the line had been secured. On December 11, 2007, U.S. Deputy Secretary of Transportation Thomas Barrett met with Governor Pawlenty in Anoka County and officially signed a Full Funding Grant Agreement of $156.8 million, nearly half of the funding for the $317 million,  line from Minneapolis to Big Lake. The money enabled the release of an additional $97.5 million in state bonding money set aside for the project.

The federal government paid $156.8 million, the state paid $98.6 million and the Anoka County Regional Rail Authority pledged $34.8 million. The remaining partners were Sherburne County Regional Rail Authority ($8.2 million), Hennepin County Regional Rail Authority ($8 million), the Metropolitan Council ($5.9 million) and the Minnesota Twins ($2.6 million, for the station improvements under the new Target Field where the Minneapolis station was constructed).  Of the $317 million total, $107.5 million went to paying BNSF for a perpetual easement for track rights and facilities along the line and to pay the BNSF employees that operate the trains. The operating budget for the first full year of service, 2010, was $16.8 million.

Construction and operation 

The Minnesota Department of Transportation (Mn/DOT) and the Northstar Corridor Development Authority (NCDA) studied options for development of the corridor to handle the increasing commuter load and felt that a commuter rail line was the best option. It was expected to cost about US$265 million in 2008 dollars, estimated to be less than one-third the cost of upgrading existing highways, though the cost would later climb to $317 million. Because almost all of the route being used already existed, the investment mostly went into building new stations, upgrading track, enhancing the safety of crossings, and updating signals. A significant portion of the funds were to extend the METRO Blue Line to the Target Field station on the west side of Interstate 394 and 5th Street. This terminal station is integrated into the Minnesota Twins' new ballpark, Target Field, which opened in March 2010.

During normal operation, the line had six trains running in the morning and evening rush hour periods, and limited service on weekends and holidays. Bus feeder lines, including the Northstar Link from St. Cloud to Big Lake station, bring residents along the corridor to the nearest train station. Once in downtown, commuters can walk upstairs to the METRO Blue and Green Lines, take a bus into other areas of the city, or go into one of the nearby buildings integrated into the Minneapolis skyway system. In the first year, 2010, Metro Ridership fell well short of its goal of 3,400 weekday trips from this station.  Metro Transit has a goal for of 5,900 by 2030 intending to save those commuters 900,000 hours over the course of a year when compared to taking a dedicated bus line.

From its opening until January 2014, Northstar trains arrived on time for 96 percent of trips making it one of the most reliable services from Metro Transit. Starting in the winter of 2014, on-time performance suffered due to heavy freight traffic and severe cold weather. By the end of February 2014, on-time reliability was down to 74 percent. Freight traffic from the North Dakota oil boom contributed to congestion and delays for trains. The delays were also felt by the Amtrak Empire Builder route which travels through the same corridor. Delays were severe enough for legislators to hold a public hearing at the State Capitol with BNSF in attendance. During the hearing, BNSF stated that delays were due to cold weather and not freight traffic. The cold weather caused mechanical issues and limited how long crews could work outside. BNSF spent money on repairs and maintenance along the corridor over 2014, which included replacing ties, switches, and adding switch covers which would protect switches from ice and snow. While January through October 2014 saw trains arriving on-time just 65.7 percent of the time, during the month of December trains were back to 95 percent on-time performance. Metro Transit offered refunds to customers whose trains were more than 10 minutes late in January and February 2015 in an effort to draw back ridership. During January 2015 trips were on time 98% of the time.

Ridership 

Ridership in the first 15 days averaged 2,207 per day (33,112 total), short of a goal of 2,460. By the end of January 2010, goals were exceeded by 3%. Ridership for 2010 was originally projected to be 897,000 though ultimately ended up at 715,000. Because ridership varies significantly through the course of a year, Metro Transit's month-to-month goals are different from the yearly average goal. Daily ridership was 2,814 in 2019, the same level it was in 2017. It was projected to be 5,590 in 2025 and 6,200 in 2030, according to a 2009 study by Kimley-Horn and Associates Inc.

Route 

At Target Field Station, the parallel rail lines of the old Great Northern Railway (north side track now BNSF) and the Minneapolis and St. Louis Railway (south side track now Union Pacific) travel eastbound past the Federal Reserve Bank, the site of the old Minneapolis Great Northern Depot, across the Mississippi River on the Minneapolis BNSF Rail Bridge and then across Nicollet Island. At a wye, the route turns northwest in the GN East side line, which then joins the parallel ex-Northern Pacific main line. The ex-Great Northern and ex-Northern Pacific lines are merged into BNSF and this is now the BNSF Northern Transcon (transcontinental) line.

The route travels north through the Northtown Classification Yards, over Interstate 694 and makes its first stop at 61st Avenue in Fridley at the yard limit of Northtown, where it enters BNSF's Staples Subdivision. The double track line continues past the current Foley Boulevard park-and-ride bus station, which is planned to be a future Northstar station and turns northwest at Coon Creek Junction, where the old GN route to Duluth (now BNSF's Hinckley Subdivision) splits off and heads straight north. The current Coon Rapids station is behind the Riverdale shopping center by Round Lake Boulevard and new stations were also built in Anoka, Elk River, and Big Lake.

The Great Northern Railway and Northern Pacific Railway had local services from Minneapolis to all of the cities currently served by Northstar up through the early 20th century. One Fridley station was about a mile north of the current stop, at Mississippi Boulevard. There possibly was a stop shared by GN and NP at Coon Creek Junction. There were at least three stations built in Anoka over the years, and two stations in Elk River and Big Lake, with both cities having one stop for each railroad.

Upgrades and potential extension to St. Cloud 
The double-track main line between Northtown Yard in Minneapolis and Coon Creek Junction in Coon Rapids is the busiest rail corridor in the Twin Cities metropolitan area. In July 2009, before the Northstar Commuter Rail commuter line began operation, this segment had hosted 63 trains per day. The Minnesota Department of Transportation would like to run more passenger trains through the corridor, including Northstar and other proposed passenger rail routes like the proposed Northern Lights Express to Duluth. A $113.4 million project to add a third main line and a new station at Foley Boulevard in Coon Rapids is planned. A $99 million grant request was filed under the American Recovery and Reinvestment Act of 2009 to cover most of the cost.  TIGER grants are expected to be awarded on February 17, 2010.

Foley station was among cuts to the Northstar plan in 2003 while federal funding was being sought prior to construction. Despite the fact the 3,200-stall parking facility already existed (sans boarding platforms), riders would not save enough time by switching from existing bus service to rail to make the stop fit within the guidelines enforced by Federal Transit Administration's cost-effectiveness index. A station in Ramsey at Ramsey Town Center was also cut prior to construction. Ramsey station construction has since been fully funded, and construction began on March 27, 2012; it was completed on November 8 and opened on November 14, 2012.

A major obstacle to extending Northstar to St. Cloud had been the lack of double-tracked rail for nine miles (14 km) from Big Lake to Becker. However, due to increased freight traffic on the line, BNSF double-tracked the corridor in 2015. The Minnesota Department of Transportation says that extending Northstar would result in 1 to 1.5 million annual trips on the line. In its 2010 State Rail Plan, the agency stated an expectation of farebox recovery ratios between 70% and 111% on the full line.  However, the same plan estimated farebox recovery ratios of just 21% to 34% on the proposed Northern Lights Express, which in a 2007 business plan had calculated ratios of over 100%. On November 8, 2010, it was announced that the planned extension of the line to St. Cloud had been indefinitely delayed.  Projected ridership is not sufficient to qualify for federal funding.

Proposals to extend the line have continued to surface in the years following opening of the line. In 2016 and 2018, Minnesota state legislators proposed extending the line to St. Cloud using existing equipment by running two daily round-trips to St. Cloud and reducing other trips to Minneapolis from five to four. Governor Mark Dayton proposed a six month demonstration service to St. Cloud in 2017 but the demonstration would have only included 1 round trip a day and not have trains stopping at stations between Minneapolis and St. Cloud. Extending the line to Camp Ripley was proposed in 2019 by House of Representative legislators. Another extension feasibility study sponsored by MnDOT was released in July 2020.

Pandemic and future 
After the onset of the COVID-19 pandemic, Metro Transit eliminated weekend service and special event service. Weekly trips dropped from 72 to 20. Ridership on the line was down 95% in August 2020 compared to before the pandemic.
  Lakeville's state representative, Jon Koznick, proposed shuttering Northstar operations in 2021 but that would require the repayment of $85 million in federal funds used to construct the project. The Republican-controlled Minnesota Senate proposed closing Northstar in the 2022 legislative session and included asking the federal government to not require the repayment of federal funds.

Metro Transit and MnDOT in combination with three counties that Northstar operates in, Anoka County, Hennepin County, and Sherburne County, agreed to a master funding agreement in 2018 that covered operating expenses through 2022.  Anoka County ceased paying their financial contribution by the second half of 2020. The county requested a reduced payment due to reduced ridership. By 2022, the county owed Metro Transit $7.9 million for operating expenses stretching from 2020 to 2022. Special event service to Minnesota Twins games was not offered in 2022 due to the funding issue. Northstar served 81,561 rides to 64 Minnesota Twins games in 2019. 

Anoka County ended up paying Metro Transit for 2020 and 2021 operating expenses after the 2021 bill was reduced from nearly $6 million to $1.95 million due to funds from BNSF and federal COVID relief bills. For the 2022 operating budget, Anoka County considered a $1.95 million payment to be their "full and final payment for 2022" despite Metro Transit requesting $4.6 million. Anoka County argued that they are paying the same amount from their 2021 bill for 2022 because the same amount of service is being offered while Metro Transit states it cannot increase service without covering the full operating costs of the line.

The Metropolitan Council is conducting a study on the future of Northstar post pandemic but the study will not produce any decisions or recommendations. The study is tentatively expected to be completed the winter of 2022–2023.

Rolling stock 

The line opened in 2009 with five MPI MP36PH-3C locomotives and seventeen Bombardier BiLevel Coach cars.  Each passenger car has about 140 seats and room for 355 when full with standees. The coaches have two doors on either side. Upon the opening, Metro Transit immediately announced that a sixth locomotive was being acquired from the Utah Transit Authority's FrontRunner service in the Salt Lake City area and a lease agreement was soon signed. Typical weekday operation requires five trains, each consisting of one locomotive and three or four coaches. A single train is used for weekend service, making three round trips each day. The platforms are only designed for five-car trains, so longer trains would require additional construction.

Metro Transit did begin experimenting in April 2010 with six-car trains for taking riders to and from weekend Twins games at Target Field. These trains overhang the platform at either end and only open one door on each of the end cars. In May, trains serving Twins games grew to eight cars, with some completely overhanging the platforms so some riders would have to board and then walk from one car to another. By June, Metro Transit had decided to purchase the sixth locomotive it had leased from UTA due to high leasing costs and the need to have an extra locomotive for when others are being repaired or inspected. A $10.1 million contingency fund built into the original cost of the service provided $2.85 million for buying the locomotive and repainting it in Northstar livery.

Incidents 
By October 2014, there had been at least five deaths involving Northstar trains, with the latest being in Coon Rapids on December 13, 2019. There have also been two train vs. car crashes.  In October 2014, a trainset was vandalized at the maintenance facility in Big Lake, bringing the total number of incidents on the line to seven.

References

External links 

Northstar Commuter Rail
Northstar route map
Northstar Link

Northstar Line
Commuter rail in Minnesota
Railway lines opened in 2009
2009 establishments in Minnesota
Metro Transit (Minnesota)